"Nobody Likes Sad Songs" is a song written by Bob McDill and Wayland Holyfield, and recorded by American country music artist Ronnie Milsap.  It was released in April 1979 as the first single from the album Images.  The song was Milsap's 12th number one on the country chart.  The single stayed at number one for a single week and spent a total of 12 weeks on the country chart.

Content
The song is told from the perspective of a once-successful performer, who laments about his current lack of success and appeal to audiences because he sings "sad" songs. He refers to his past successes, including his ability to entertain large crowds and repertoire of mainly uptempo, "happy" songs. However, his personal life is anything but happy, and it affects his performing style; he soon begins performing only heartbreak songs, songs he quickly finds his fans don't want to hear. His fans soon begin alienating him, and soon nobody is coming to his shows. Worse, when he tries to rekindle his success by performing his previous "happy" songs, he finds he is unable to credibly do so because of his personal heartbreak.

Later, the performer's tour manager contacts him and announces he is dropping him from the tour. He admonishes him: "What happened son, you had it made?/Why'd you change the way you played?"

Charts

Weekly charts

Year-end charts

References

1979 songs
1979 singles
Ronnie Milsap songs
Songs written by Wayland Holyfield
Songs written by Bob McDill
Song recordings produced by Tom Collins (record producer)
RCA Records singles
Songs about music